Candlemass is a Swedish epic doom metal band established in Stockholm in 1984 by bassist, songwriter and bandleader Leif Edling and drummer Matz Ekström. The band had a defining influence on doom metal, and the genre itself is named after their debut album Epicus Doomicus Metallicus. Along with Pentagram, Saint Vitus and Trouble, Candlemass has been referred to as one of the "big four of doom metal".

After releasing five full-length albums and touring extensively throughout the 1980s and early 1990s, Candlemass disbanded in 1994, but reunited three years later. After breaking up again in 2002, Candlemass reformed in 2004 and have continued to record and perform since then.

History

Formation and early career (1984–1990) 
After the breakup of his first band Nemesis, bassist Leif Edling started his own band under the name Candlemass with (session) vocalist Johan Längqvist, drummer Matz Ekström, guitarist Mats "Mappe" Bjorkman and Klas Bergwall. Their first release, Epicus Doomicus Metallicus (1986), immediately secured their standing, positioning the band within metal circles, setting a milestone in the doom metal scene. Following the band's debut album Längqvist was replaced by Messiah Marcolin. By the time the band entered the studio to record their second effort, Nightfall, in 1987, Bergwall and Ekström had left the band. Jan Lindh joined the band on drums, and Lars Johansson joined the band on guitars following the completion of the album.

Candlemass's next two albums were Ancient Dreams (1988) and Tales of Creation (1989). In 1990, the band released a live album Live. Shortly afterward, a dispute between the band members resulted in Messiah Marcolin's departure in 1991.

New singer-era, hiatus and first reunion (1991–2003) 
After Marcolin left, Candlemass recruited vocalist Thomas Vikström and recorded Chapter VI (1992). The band then toured in support of that album. By 1994, Candlemass had called it quits, partly because Chapter VI was unsuccessful, and partially because Edling had formed another project under the name of Abstrakt Algebra. With Abstrakt Algebra not doing well, Leif suddenly recruited a new line-up under the name of Candlemass and recorded the album Dactylis Glomerata, which was a combination of songs for a new Abstrakt Algebra CD and some new material. A year later the album From the 13th Sun was released. Both albums featured singer Bjorn Flodqvist.

In 2002, the members of a past Candlemass line-up reunited. They performed some well-received live shows and released another live album. Other albums released by the reformed band were remastered versions of Epicus Doomicus Metallicus, Nightfall, Ancient Dreams, and Tales of Creation. A DVD called Documents of Doom was released as well. The band was working on a new album and recorded some new songs while searching for a record label when differences arose again, resulting in Candlemass disbanding a second time. In the meantime, Leif Edling started a new project, Krux, with former Abstrakt Algebra singer Mats Levén and two members of Entombed.

Second reunion (2004–2006) 

In November 2004, the band announced that they had re-united for the second time. They had recorded a new album, named simply Candlemass, with the same line-up. It was released in May 2005. They won a Swedish Grammy for it in 2005.

In 2006 the band announced that a new album was in preparation, to be released sometime in 2007. In October 2006, after much uncertainty regarding Messiah Marcolin's participation, it was settled that Messiah was out for good.

Robert Lowe era (2007–2012) 
Candlemass found a new vocalist, Robert Lowe (Solitude Aeturnus), who recorded with the band's ninth album King of the Grey Islands, which was released on 22 June 2007.
The album is self-produced except for four songs produced by Andy Sneap.

On 31 March 2007, Candlemass celebrated a slightly delayed twentieth anniversary. To commemorate the celebration, original singer Johan Längqvist appeared live with the band for the first time. The event was recorded and later released as a DVD.

Mats "Mappe" Bjorkman was sentenced to serve two years behind bars for grand theft in March 2008. He has been convicted of stealing over 35,000 CDs and DVDs priced at around 3 million Sek (Around $500,000).

Candlemass worked on a tenth studio album in 2008. It was intended to be titled Hammer of Doom, but they renamed it to Death Magic Doom because the name coincided with a German festival. The album was scheduled to be released on 27 March 2009, but it was delayed until 3 April 2009.

In 2009, bassist Leif Edling told Soundshock that work on the next Candlemass album would likely begin before 2011. However, this plan fell through, and Leif had stated that the album's release date was pushed back to 2012, in order for the band to concentrate on the 25th anniversary of their 1986 debut Epicus Doomicus Metallicus.

On 14 October 2011, it was announced that Candlemass were signed to the Austrian label Napalm Records, who released their eleventh studio album Psalms for the Dead in June 2012. Despite this, bassist Leif Edling stated that the band would not split up, but wanted to stop before they "get too old and start putting out half-lame albums."

Mats Levén as new singer (2012–2018) 

On 2 June 2012, Candlemass announced via their website that Robert Lowe had left the band as vocalist, mainly due to the quality of the live performances and explained to be "a very difficult decision for the band", and was replaced for the band's upcoming shows by longtime friend and collaborator of Candlemass, Mats Levén (of Yngwie Malmsteen, Therion, Treat, and At Vance fame, among others). Levén had earlier worked with Leif Edling in Abstrakt Algebra and Krux and sang on demos from the Candlemass and King of the Grey Islands sessions, found on the box set Doomology. In addition, keyboardist Per Wiberg (ex-Opeth, Spiritual Beggars) also joined the band on stage for these live shows.

In January 2013, Candlemass was voted the greatest Swedish hard rock/metal band of all time by the writers of Sweden Rock Magazine, Scandinavia's biggest hard rock magazine as well as Sweden's biggest music magazine by circulation. They were featured in a list of the 100 greatest Swedish hard rock/metal bands of all time in a special jubilee edition, to celebrate the magazine's 100th issue. In connection with this, it was also revealed that Candlemass, along with death metal band Entombed (No. 2 on the list), were to perform jointly at a special jubilee concert in Stockholm arranged by the magazine. In July 2014, Candlemass headlined the Väsby Rock Festival in their hometown Upplands Väsby.

Despite earlier claims that Psalms for the Dead would be their final album, bassist Leif Edling had stated that he was open to recording new music with Candlemass again. To coincide with the 30th anniversary of Epicus Doomicus Metallicus, Candlemass released the EP Death Thy Lover on 3 June 2016. Additionally, on 29 April 2016, the band released a career-spanning coffee-table book. The book also featured two CDs containing the top picks by Leif Edling and Messiah Marcolin respectively, a CD with rare tracks from their early career (including the Witchcraft demo), and two DVDs with three live performances.

Return of Johan Langquist (2018–present) 
On 3 September 2018, Candlemass announced the return of Johan Langquist to the band after a 32-year hiatus. The band stated, "We wanted to find our way back to the roots of Candlemass, back to the soul and essence of the band. Johan Langquist is back and we hope this will give us some new energy and kickstart the heart of doom again. We don't know if it will last 10 more years or even 5, but if it will give us just another year of having fun and playing the music that we love so much, it will be a blast! The circle is closed, Johan is back!" The band also announced that they were recording a new album for a 2019 release, making it not only the first Candlemass studio album since 2012's Psalms for the Dead, but their first with Langquist since 1986's Epicus Doomicus Metallicus.

On 6 December 2018, Candlemass announced that their twelfth album was titled The Door to Doom and would be released on 22 February 2019. It was also revealed that the album would include a guest appearance by Black Sabbath's Tony Iommi, who contributes to a guitar solo to one of the album's tracks "Astorolus – The Great Octopus". The band released an EP The Pendulum on 27 March 2020. According to bassist Leif Edling, Candlemass will likely not release their new studio album until 2022 or 2023.

On 18 August 2022, the band announced their thirteenth studio album, Sweet Evil Sun, would be released on 18 November.

Influences 
Candlemass' musical style is markedly influenced by early Black Sabbath. Edling, the band's main songwriter and sole constant member, has been influenced by Black Sabbath, as well as bands like Blue Öyster Cult, Mercyful Fate/King Diamond, Bachman–Turner Overdrive, Rush, Nazareth, the Jimi Hendrix Experience, Judas Priest, Motörhead and Venom.

Personnel

Members 

Current members
 Leif Edling – bass (1984–1994, 1997–2002, 2004–present), vocals (1984–1986)
 Mats "Mappe" Björkman – rhythm guitar (1984–1994, 2002, 2004–present)
 Lars Johansson – lead guitar (1987–1994, 2002, 2004–present)
 Jan Lindh – drums, percussion (1987–1994, 2002, 2004–present)
 Johan Längqvist – vocals (1986, 2018–present)

Former members
 Mike Wead – lead guitar (1987)
 Klas Bergwall – lead guitar (1984–1987)
 Matz Ekström – drums, percussion (1984–1987)
 Messiah Marcolin – vocals (1986–1991, 2002–2006)
 Thomas Vikström – vocals (1991–1994)
 Carl Westholm – keyboards (1997–1999)
 Michael Amott – guitars (1997–1999)
 Björn Flodkvist – vocals (1997–2002)
 Jejo Perkovic – drums, percussion (1997–2002)
 Mats Ståhl – guitars (1999–2002)
 Robert Lowe – vocals (2006–2012)
 Mats Levén – vocals (2006, 2012–2018)

Line-ups

Timeline

Recording timeline

Discography

Studio albums

Live albums 
Live (1990)
Doomed for Live – Reunion 2002 (2002)
No Sleep 'til Athens (2010)
Ashes to Ashes (2010)
Epicus Doomicus Metallicus – Live at Roadburn 2011 (2013)
Live at the Marquee 1988 (2013)
Dynamo Doom (2019)

Compilation albums 
The Best of Candlemass: As It Is, as It Was (1994)
Black Heart of Candlemass (2002)
Diamonds of Doom (2003) (limited vinyl record)
Essential Doom (2004)
Dactylis Glomerata & Abstrakt Algebra II (previously unreleased album) (2008)
Introducing (2013) (career spanning album)
Behind the Wall of Doom (2016)

Box sets 
Doomology (2010)

EPs and singles 
Samarithan (1988)
At the Gallows End (1988)
Sjunger Sigge Fürst (1993)
Wiz (1998)
Nimis (2001)
At the Gallows End/Samarithan (2005)
Dark Reflections/Into The Unfathomed Tower (2005)
Mirror Mirror/The Bells Of Acheron (2005)
Solitude/Crystal Ball (2005)
Assassin of the Light (2005)
Black Dwarf (with Robert Lowe on vocals) (2007)
Lucifer Rising (2008)
If I Ever Die (2009)
Don't Fear the Reaper (2010)
Dancing in the Temple of the Mad Queen Bee (13 April 2012)
Candlemass vs. Entombed (Limited edition CD, recorded for Sweden Rock Magazine's 100th issue)
Death Thy Lover (2016)
Dark Are the Veils of Death (2017)
House of Doom (2018)
The Pendulum (2020)

Demos 
Witchcraft (1984)
Second demo (1984)
Tales of Creation (1985)
Demo with Marcolin (1987)

DVDs 
Documents of Doom (2002)
The Curse of Candlemass (2005)
Candlemass 20 Year Anniversary (2007)
Ashes to Ashes Live (2010)

References

External links 

 Candlemass official webpage
 
 
 

Swedish doom metal musical groups
Musical groups established in 1984
Musical quintets
Nuclear Blast artists
Napalm Records artists
Articles which contain graphical timelines
Metal Blade Records artists
Swedish heavy metal musical groups